Events from the year 1969 in the United Kingdom. The year is dominated by the beginnings of the Troubles in Northern Ireland.

Incumbents
 Monarch  – Elizabeth II
 Prime Minister – Harold Wilson (Labour)
 Parliament – 44th

Events

January
 January – The Space hopper toy is introduced to Britain.
 2 January
 People's Democracy begins a march from Belfast to Derry City, Northern Ireland to gain publicity and to promote its cause. 
 Australian media mogul Rupert Murdoch purchases the best-selling UK Sunday newspaper The News of the World.
 4 January – Guitarist Jimi Hendrix caused complaints of arrogance from television producers after playing an impromptu version of "Sunshine of your Love" past his allotted timeslot on the BBC One programme Happening for Lulu.
 10 January – Protesters in Northern Ireland defied police orders to abandon a planned march.
 14 January – Sir Matt Busby, hugely successful manager of Manchester United F.C. for the last twenty-four years, announced his retirement as manager. He would become a director at the end of the season, and hand over first-team duties to current first team trainer and former player Wilf McGuinness.
 17 January – Secretary of State for Employment and Productivity Barbara Castle published a White Paper In Place of Strife proposing powers of intervention in advance of industrial action. This proved unacceptable to the Trades Union Congress.
 18 January – Pete Best won his defamation lawsuit against The Beatles. He had originally sought $8,000,000 but was awarded considerably less.
 24 January
 Violent protests by students about the installation of steel security gates closed the London School of Economics, which did not reopen for three weeks.
 Launch of the Ford Capri, a four-seater sporting coupe designed to compete with the likes of the MG B and which Ford expects to become a top 10 seller in Britain.
 27 January
 London School of Economics students occupied the University of London Union building in Malet Street in protest at the closure of the LSE.
 Reverend Ian Paisley, the hard line Protestant leader in Northern Ireland, is jailed for three months for illegal assembly.
 30 January – The Beatles' rooftop concert: The Beatles perform together in public for the final time, on the rooftop of Apple Records in London; the impromptu concert was broken up by the police.

February
 18 February – Pop star Lulu, 20, married Maurice Gibb of the Bee Gees at St James Church, Gerrards Cross.

March
 March – The first B&Q DIY superstore was set up in Southampton by Richard Block and David Quayle.
 4 March – The Kray twins were both found guilty of murder: Ronnie of murdering George Cornell; Reggie of murdering Jack "the Hat" McVitie. On 5 March, they were sentenced to life imprisonment with a recommended minimum of thirty years by Mr Justice Melford Stevenson.  
 7 March – The London Underground Victoria line was opened by The Queen.
 12 March – Paul McCartney married Linda Eastman at Marylebone register office in London.
 17 March –  The Longhope life-boat from Orkney was lost; all eight crew members on board perished.
 19 March
 British paratroopers and Marines land on the island of Anguilla, ending its unrecognized independence.
 The 385-metre tall Emley Moor transmitting station television mast in West Yorkshire collapses because of ice.
 25 March – John Lennon marries Yoko Ono in Gibraltar.
 27 March – First ordination of a woman in the Church of Scotland takes place, that of Catherine McConnachie by the Presbytery of Aberdeen.
 29 March – Lulu, representing the UK with the song "Boom Bang-a-Bang", shared first place in the Eurovision Song Contest in a four-way tie with France, the Netherlands and the host country, Spain.

April
 April – The Raleigh Chopper children's wheelie bike is launched.
 1 April – The Hawker Siddeley Harrier GR.1 V/STOL "jump jet" fighter enters service with the Royal Air Force.
 9 April
 The British prototype Concorde airliner makes its first flight, from Bristol Filton Airport (the first French flight was on 2 March).
  Sikh busmen in Wolverhampton win the right to wear their turbans whilst on duty.
 17 April
Representation of the People Act lowered the voting age from 21 to 18 with effect from February 1970. It also permitted candidates to have a party label included on the ballot paper, and removed the right (theoretically restored in 1967) of convicted prisoners to vote in Parliamentary elections.
 Bernadette Devlin won the Mid Ulster by-election and became the youngest female MP at this date at 21 years old.
 20 April – British troops arrived in Northern Ireland to reinforce the Royal Ulster Constabulary.
 22 April – Robin Knox-Johnston became the first person to make a solo non-stop global circumnavigation under sail, returning to Falmouth, Cornwall.
 24 April
 British Leyland Motor Corporation launches Britain's first production hatchback car, the Austin Maxi, designed to compete with family saloons like the Ford Cortina and following a new European design concept started in 1965 by French carmaker Renault's R16 range.
 The final episode of the long-running BBC Radio serial drama Mrs Dale's Diary was broadcast.
 26 April – Manchester City F.C. won the FA Cup with a 1-0 win over Leicester City in the Wembley final.
 28 April – Leeds United won the Football League First Division title for the first time in their history.

May
 2 May – Ocean liner Queen Elizabeth 2 departed from Southampton on her maiden voyage to New York.
 23 May – The Who released the concept album Tommy.
 29 May – Carry On Camping was released, becoming the year's most popular film at the UK box office.

June
 7 June – Rock supergroup Blind Faith plays its first gig in front of 100,000 people in London's Hyde Park.
 14 June – The black horse Burmese, ridden by the Queen, makes her first appearance at Trooping the Colour; she would continue in this role until 1986.
 21 June
 The showing of television documentary The Royal Family, attracted more than 30,600,000 viewers, more than half of the entire UK population at the time, an all-time British record for a non-current event programme.
 Patrick Troughton made his final appearance as the Second Doctor in Doctor Who in the final episode of The War Games which was also the last episode to be recorded in black and white. 
 24 June – After a referendum in Rhodesia voted in favour of becoming a Republic, the Governor of Southern Rhodesia Sir Humphrey Gibbs left Government House, severing the last diplomatic relationship with the United Kingdom.
 30 June – Two members of the Mudiad Amddiffyn Cymru (Movement for the Defence of Wales) were killed whilst placing a bomb outside government offices in Abergele in an attempt to disrupt the following day's events.

July
 1 July
 Prince Charles (now Charles III), is invested as Prince of Wales with his title at Caernarfon.
John Lennon, Yoko Ono and their children are hospitalised at Golspie in Scotland following a car accident while on holiday.
 3 July – Swansea was granted city status.
 5 July – The Rolling Stones performed at the free festival The Stones in the Park outdoors in Hyde Park, London, in front of at least a quarter of a million fans, two days after the death of founder Brian Jones.
 10 July – Donald Crowhurst's sailing trimaran Teignmouth Electron is found drifting and unoccupied in mid-Atlantic; it was presumed that Crowhurst committed suicide (or fell overboard) at sea earlier in the month, having falsified his progress in the solo Sunday Times Golden Globe Race.
 12 July – Golfer Tony Jacklin won The Open Championship.
 20–21 July – BBC Television continued broadcasting overnight to provide coverage of the Apollo 11 moon landing; Neil Armstrongs first steps on the surface took place at 03:56 British Summer Time on 21 July. Television coverage to Europe was transmitted via Goonhilly Satellite Earth Station in Cornwall.
 23 July – BBC Two television first aired the Pot Black snooker tournament.
 24 July – British lecturer Gerald Brooke was freed from a Soviet prison in exchange for the spies Morris and Lona Cohen.
 25 July – The Family Law Reform Act 1969 receives royal assent and comes partly into effect in England and Wales. It reduced the age of majority from 21 to 18 (with effect from 1 January 1970); allowed a bastard child to inherit on the intestacy of a parent; and allowed competent 16- and 17-year-olds to consent to medical treatment.

August
 1 August – The pre-decimal halfpenny ceases to be legal tender.
 8 August – The Beatles at 11:30 have photographer Iain Macmillan take their photo on a zebra crossing on Abbey Road.
 12 August – The Troubles: Violence erupts after the Apprentice Boys of Derry march in Derry, Northern Ireland, resulting in a three-day communal riot known as the Battle of the Bogside, and violence elsewhere in Northern Ireland.
 13–17 August – Sectarian rioting in Northern Ireland.
 13 August – The Taoiseach of the Republic of Ireland, Jack Lynch, made a speech on Teilifís Éireann saying that his government "can no longer stand by" and requesting a United Nations peacekeeping force for Northern Ireland.
 14 August – British troops were deployed in Northern Ireland to restore law and order.
 30–31 August – The second Isle of Wight Festival attracted 150,000 pop music fans, with the appearance of Bob Dylan a major draw.

September
 11 September – The housing charity Shelter released a report claiming that there are up to 3,000,000 people in need of rehousing due to poor living conditions.
 16 September – Iconic 1960s fashion store Biba reopened on Kensington High Street.
 21 September – Police evicted squatters of the London Street Commune from 144 Piccadilly.
 26 September – The Beatles release their Abbey Road album which is an enormous commercial success and, although receiving mixed reviews at this time, comes to be viewed by many as the group's best.
 28 September – The National Trust acquired ownership of the island of Lundy.

October
 1 October – The Post Office becomes a statutory corporation.
 5 October – The first episode of surreal sketch comedy series Monty Python's Flying Circus is broadcast on BBC Television.
 10 October – The Government accepts the recommendations of Lord Hunt's report on policing in Northern Ireland, including the abolition of the Ulster Special Constabulary.
 13 October – An unofficial strike amongst British mineworkers begins, over the working hours of surface workers.
 14 October 
 The new seven-sided 50p coin was introduced as replacement for the 10-shilling note, to a mixed reception from the British public, with many people complaining that it was easily confused with the 10p coin.
 With a general election due within the next eighteen months, opinion polls show the Conservatives comfortably ahead of Labour, by up to 24 points.
 16 October – Peter Nichols' black comedy The National Health is premiered by the National Theatre at the Old Vic in London.
 21 October – Led Zeppelin release Led Zeppelin II to critical acclaim and commercial success.

November
 15 November – Regular colour television broadcasts begin on BBC One and ITV.
 16 November – BBC One first broadcasts the children's television series Clangers, made by Oliver Postgate and Peter Firmin's Smallfilms in stop motion animation.
 17 November – The Sun newspaper is relaunched as a tabloid under the ownership of Rupert Murdoch.
 19 November – Ken Loach's film Kes is released at the London Film Festival.
 25 November – John Lennon returns his MBE to protest against the British Government's involvement in Biafra and support of the U.S. war in Vietnam.

December
 5 December – The Rolling Stones album Let It Bleed is released.
 10 December – Derek Harold Richard Barton won the Nobel Prize in Chemistry jointly with Odd Hassel "for their contributions to the development of the concept of conformation and its application in chemistry".
 15 December – Martins Bank was purchased by Barclays.
 17 December – Constitutional law case of Anisminic Ltd v Foreign Compensation Commission decided in the House of Lords established in English administrative law the "collateral fact doctrine", that any error of law made by a public body will make its decision a nullity and that a statutory exclusion clause does not deprive the courts from their jurisdiction in judicial review unless it expressly states this.
 18 December
 The abolition of the death penalty for murder was made permanent by Parliament.
 The sixth James Bond film – On Her Majesty's Secret Service – was released in UK cinemas. Bond was played by Australian-born model George Lazenby for the only time, after Sean Connery quit the role following You Only Live Twice. Starring alongside him was Yorkshire-born actress Diana Rigg.
 26 December – A fire at the Rose and Crown Hotel, Saffron Walden, kills eleven.
 30 December – The Linwood bank robbery leaves two police officers dead.

Undated
 The Chancellor of the Exchequer Roy Jenkins introduced Mortgage Interest Relief at Source (MIRAS) to encourage home ownership; it allowed borrowers tax relief for interest payments on their mortgage.
 Golden eagles were found to be nesting in England for the first time in modern history, at Haweswater in the Lake District.
 Completion of the Castle Vale estate in Birmingham, the largest postwar housing estate in Britain. The new estate predominantly consisted of council housing, including 34 tower blocks –– the largest number on any single British housing estate. The first residents moved onto Castle Vale in 1964 when the first houses and flats were completed.

Publications 
 Kingsley Amis's novel The Green Man.
 Agatha Christie's Hercule Poirot novel Hallowe'en Party.
 John Fowles' novel The French Lieutenant's Woman.
 Antonia Fraser's biography Mary Queen of Scots.
 George MacDonald Fraser's novel Flashman.
 P. H. Newby's novel Something to Answer For.
 The anthology Children of Albion: Poetry of the Underground in Britain edited by Michael Horovitz.

Births

January – March
 1 January – Nicholas Gleaves, actor and playwright
 4 January – Mary Macleod, lawyer and politician
 12 January – David Mitchell, English author
 13 January – Stephen Hendry, Scottish snooker player
 5 February – Michael Sheen, Welsh actor
 19 February – Stewart Faulkner, English long jumper
 21 February – James Dean Bradfield, Welsh musician (Manic Street Preachers)
 1 March – Dafydd Ieuan, Welsh drummer (Super Furry Animals)
 5 March - Paul Blackthorne, English actor 
 20 March - Yvette Cooper, politician
 March – Jez Butterworth, dramatist and screenwriter

April – June
 4 April – Karren Brady, English sporting business executive
 9 April 
 Tracie Andrews, English criminal convicted of murdering her fiancé
 Barnaby Kay, actor
 22 April – Dion Dublin, football player and commentator
 26 April – Kate Hardie, actress, director and screenwriter
 27 April
 Tess Daly, English television presenter
 Mica Paris, born Michelle Wallen, soul singer, presenter and actress
 6 May – Jim Magilton, Northern Irish footballer
 21 May – Martin Harris, English backstroke swimmer
 25 May – Dominic Mohan, journalist
 June – Emma Walmsley, English business executive
 2 June
 Cy Chadwick, English actor and producer
 Jamie Thraves, English film writer, director and music video director
 22 June – Simon Taylor, English graphic artist

July – September
 26 July – Tanni Grey-Thompson, British Paralympian
 4 August – Jojo Moyes, English romance novelist
 7 August – Domino Harvey, British bounty hunter (died 2005)
 29 August – Joe Swail, Northern Irish snooker player
 4 September – James Cleverly, English politician
 20 September – Jo Jennings, English high jumper
 22 September – Sue Perkins, English comedy performer
 25 September – Catherine Zeta-Jones, Welsh actress
 26 September – Paul Warhurst, English football player
 28 September – Angus Robertson, Scottish politician

October – December
 9 October
 PJ Harvey, English rock singer-songwriter and instrumentalist
 Steve McQueen, black British film director
 15 October – Dominic West, English actor
 16 October – Suzanne Virdee, BBC newsreader
 1 November – Diane Parish, actress
 13 November – Gerard Butler, Scottish actor
 19 November – Michael Lee, English rock drummer (died 2008)
 3 December – Bill Steer, musician
 5 December 
 Sajid Javid, English Conservative politician and Cabinet minister
 Catherine Tate, actress and comedian
 11 December – Phil Spencer, TV personality
 12 December – Rodney P (Panton), MC, "godfather of British hip hop"
 18 December – Irvin Duguid, Scottish rock keyboard player (Stiltskin)
 19 December – Richard Hammond, English TV presenter
 24 December 
 Nick Love, film director and writer
 Ed Miliband, English politician, leader of the Labour Party
 30 December – Jay Kay, English jazz-funk singer-songwriter (Jamiroquai)

Deaths

January – March
 4 January – Violet and Daisy Hilton, English conjoined twin actresses (born 1908)
 8 January – Albert Hill, British athlete (born 1889)
 11 January – Richmal Crompton, fiction writer (born 1890)
 2 February – Boris Karloff, English actor (born 1887)
 14 February – Kenneth Horne, radio comedy performer (born 1907)
 16 February – Kingsley Martin, political editor (born 1897)
 11 March – John Wyndham, English science fiction writer (born 1903)
 25 March – Billy Cotton, British bandleader and entertainer (born 1899)

April – June
 4 May – Sir Osbert Sitwell, English writer (born 1892)
 23 May – Sir Owen Williams, civil engineer (born 1890)
 22 June – Judy Garland, American film actress and singer (born 1922)

July – September
 3 July – Brian Jones, British musician (The Rolling Stones) (born 1942)
 9 August – Cecil Frank Powell, British physicist, Nobel Prize laureate (born 1903)
 27 August – Ivy Compton-Burnett, English novelist (born 1884)
 25 September – Frank Inglis, British air vice marshal (born 1899)

October – December
 18 November – Ted Heath, bandleader (born 1902)
 4 December – Oswald Short, aviation pioneer and aircraft builder, youngest of the Short Brothers (born 1883)
 5 December – Princess Alice of Battenberg, wife of Prince Andrew of Greece and Denmark and mother of Prince Philip, Duke of Edinburgh (born 1885)
 7 December – Eric Portman, actor (born 1901)

See also
 1969 in British music
 1969 in British television
 List of British films of 1969

References

 
Years of the 20th century in the United Kingdom